Jordan Davis may refer to:

 Jordan Davis (soccer) (born 1983), American soccer player
 Jordan Davis (poet) (born 1970), American poet
 Jordan Davis (singer) (born 1988), American pop/country singer
 Jordan Davis (basketball) (born 1997), American basketball player
 Jordan Russell Davis (1995–2012), see Murder of Jordan Davis
 Jordan Davis (American football) (born 2000), American football player

See also 

 Jordan Davies (disambiguation)